Rekha Shanti Sharma is a Canadian actress of Indo-Fijian descent, best known for her role as Tory Foster on Battlestar Galactica, and Ellen Landry on Star Trek: Discovery.

Career
Sharma began acting career in her 20s. She has stage experience but also appeared in television series such as Da Vinci's City Hall, House M.D., The Lone Gunmen, Smallville, Supernatural, John Doe, Dark Angel, The Twilight Zone, Sanctuary, Hellcats, The Listener, Star Trek: Discovery, Battlestar Galactica, and the 2009 re-imagined television series of V.

She also appeared in the movies The Core, Tasmanian Devils, and Aliens vs. Predator: Requiem.

Filmography

Film

Television

Video games

Web series

References

External links
 
 
 
 
Team Donut by Rekha Sharma on Facebook

21st-century Canadian actresses
Canadian actresses of Indian descent
Living people
Sarangi players
Actresses from Vancouver
Year of birth missing (living people)